Bezirk Radkersburg is a former district of the state of Styria in Austria. Radkersburg merged with the district of Feldbach to form the new district Südoststeiermark on January 1, 2013.

Municipalities
Suburbs, hamlets and other subdivisions of a municipality are indicated in small characters.
 Bad Radkersburg
 Bierbaum am Auersbach
 Deutsch Goritz
Hofstätten bei Deutsch Goritz, Krobathen, Oberspitz, Salsach, Schrötten bei Deutsch Goritz, Unterspitz, Weixelbaum, Haselbach
 Dietersdorf am Gnasbach
 Eichfeld
Hainsdorf-Brunnsee, Oberrakitsch
 Gosdorf
Diepersdorf, Fluttendorf, Misselsdorf
 Halbenrain
Dietzen, Donnersdorf, Dornau, Drauchen, Hürth, Oberpurkla, Unterpurkla, Hof bei Straden, Karla, Neusetz, Radochen
 Klöch
Deutsch Haseldorf, Gruisla, Klöchberg, Pölten
 Mettersdorf am Saßbach
Landorf, Rannersdorf am Saßbach, Rohrbach am Rosenberg, Zehensdorf
 Mureck
 Murfeld
Lichendorf, Oberschwarza, Seibersdorf bei Sankt Veit, Unterschwarza, Weitersfeld an der Mur
 Radkersburg Umgebung
Altneudörfl, Dedenitz, Goritz bei Radkersburg, Hummersdorf, Laafeld, Pfarrsdorf, Pridahof, Sicheldorf, Zelting
 Ratschendorf
 Sankt Peter am Ottersbach
Edla, Entschendorf am Ottersbach, Oberrosenberg, Perbersdorf bei Sankt Peter, Wiersdorf, Wittmannsdorf
 Straden
Hart bei Straden, Kronnersdorf, Marktl, Nägelsdorf, Schwabau, Waasen am Berg, Wieden-Klausen, Waldprecht
 Tieschen
Größing, Jörgen, Laasen, Patzen, Pichla bei Radkersburg
 Trössing
 Weinburg am Saßbach
Perbersdorf bei Sankt Veit, Pichla bei Mureck, Priebing, Siebing

States and territories disestablished in 2013